The meridian 68° west of Greenwich is a line of longitude that extends from the North Pole across the Arctic Ocean, North America, the Atlantic Ocean, the Caribbean Sea, South America, the Pacific Ocean, the Southern Ocean, and Antarctica to the South Pole.

The 68th meridian west forms a great circle with the 112th meridian east.

From Pole to Pole
Starting at the North Pole and heading south to the South Pole, the 68th meridian west passes through:

{| class="wikitable plainrowheaders"
! scope="col" width="120" | Co-ordinates
! scope="col" | Country, territory or sea
! scope="col" | Notes
|-
| style="background:#b0e0e6;" | 
! scope="row" style="background:#b0e0e6;" | Arctic Ocean
| style="background:#b0e0e6;" |
|-
| style="background:#b0e0e6;" | 
! scope="row" style="background:#b0e0e6;" | Lincoln Sea
| style="background:#b0e0e6;" |
|-
| 
! scope="row" | 
| Nunavut — Ellesmere Island
|-
| style="background:#b0e0e6;" | 
! scope="row" style="background:#b0e0e6;" | Nares Strait
| style="background:#b0e0e6;" |
|-
| 
! scope="row" | 
|Inglefield Land
|-
| style="background:#b0e0e6;" | 
! scope="row" style="background:#b0e0e6;" | Baffin Bay
| style="background:#b0e0e6;" |
|-
| 
! scope="row" | 
| Nunavut —  Baffin Island, Aulitivik Island, and Baffin Island again
|-
| style="background:#b0e0e6;" | 
! scope="row" style="background:#b0e0e6;" | Hudson Strait
| style="background:#b0e0e6;" |
|-
| 
! scope="row" | 
| Nunavut — Akpatok Island
|-
| style="background:#b0e0e6;" | 
! scope="row" style="background:#b0e0e6;" | Ungava Bay
| style="background:#b0e0e6;" |
|-
| 
! scope="row" | 
| Quebec
|-
| style="background:#b0e0e6;" | 
! scope="row" style="background:#b0e0e6;" | Saint Lawrence River
| style="background:#b0e0e6;" |
|-valign="top"
| 
! scope="row" | 
| Quebec New Brunswick — from 
|-
| 
! scope="row" | 
| Maine
|-valign="top"
| style="background:#b0e0e6;" | 
! scope="row" style="background:#b0e0e6;" | Atlantic Ocean
| style="background:#b0e0e6;" | Passing just west of the island of Mona,  (at )
|-valign="top"
| style="background:#b0e0e6;" | 
! scope="row" style="background:#b0e0e6;" | Caribbean Sea
| style="background:#b0e0e6;" | Passing just east of the island of Bonaire,  (at ) Passing just west of the Las Aves Archipelago,  (at )
|-
| 
! scope="row" | 
|-
| 
! scope="row" | 
|
|-valign="top"
| 
! scope="row" | 
| Amazonas Acre — from 
|-valign="top"
| 
! scope="row" | 
| Passing just east of La Paz (at )
|-
| 
! scope="row" | 
|
|-
| 
! scope="row" | 
|
|-
| style="background:#b0e0e6;" | 
! scope="row" style="background:#b0e0e6;" | Atlantic Ocean
| style="background:#b0e0e6;" |
|-
| 
! scope="row" | 
| Isla Grande de Tierra del Fuego
|-
| 
! scope="row" | 
| Navarino Island
|-
| style="background:#b0e0e6;" | 
! scope="row" style="background:#b0e0e6;" | Pacific Ocean
| style="background:#b0e0e6;" |
|-
| 
! scope="row" | 
| Hoste Island
|-valign="top"
| style="background:#b0e0e6;" | 
! scope="row" style="background:#b0e0e6;" | Pacific Ocean
| style="background:#b0e0e6;" | Passing just west of Hermite Island,  (at )
|-
| style="background:#b0e0e6;" | 
! scope="row" style="background:#b0e0e6;" | Southern Ocean
| style="background:#b0e0e6;" |
|-valign="top"
| 
! scope="row" | Antarctica
|-
| style="background:#b0e0e6;" | 
! scope="row" style="background:#b0e0e6;" | Southern Ocean
| style="background:#b0e0e6;" | Marguerite Bay
|-valign="top"
| 
! scope="row" | Antarctica
|-
|}

See also
67th meridian west
69th meridian west

w068 meridian west